Paul Crosby may refer to:
 Paul Crosby (basketball), American basketball player
 Paul Crosby (criminal), Irish criminal
 Paul Crosby, drummer with Saliva (band)

See also
 Paul Crosbie, football player and manager